Hypera diversipunctata is a species of true weevil in the beetle family Curculionidae. It is found in North America and Europe.

Subspecies
These two subspecies belong to the species Hypera diversipunctata:
 Hypera diversipunctata educta Tempère, 1972
 Hypera diversipunctata seigneurici Tempère, 1984

References

Further reading

External links

 

Hyperinae
Articles created by Qbugbot
Beetles described in 1798